Synchronized swimming was introduced to the Olympic Games at the 1984 Summer Olympics in Los Angeles, with two events, both for women only. Former competitive swimmer and MGM film star Esther Williams served as commentator.  The events were contested at the McDonald's Olympic Swim Stadium.

Medal summary

Medal table

References
 

 
1984 Summer Olympics events
1984
1984 in synchronized swimming
Synchronized swimming competitions in the United States